Carl Dennis (born September 17, 1939) is an American poet and educator. His book Practical Gods won the 2002 Pulitzer Prize for poetry.

Life and work
Born in St. Louis, Missouri, on September 17, 1939, Dennis attended Oberlin College and the University of Chicago before receiving his bachelor's degree from the University of Minnesota in 1961. In 1966, Dennis received his Ph.D. in English literature from the University of California, Berkeley. That same year he became an assistant professor of English at University at Buffalo, where he has spent most of his career; in 2002, he became an artist-in-residence there. Dennis has also served on the faculty of the graduate program at Warren Wilson College.

Dennis has received several prizes for his poetry in addition to the Pulitzer Prize for Poetry, including a Fellowship at the Rockefeller Study Center in Bellagio, Italy, a Guggenheim Fellowship (1984), a National Endowment for the Arts Fellowship in Poetry (1988), and the Ruth Lilly Poetry Prize (2000).

Dennis is the brother of American composer Robert Dennis.

Dennis's poetry

Dennis writes often of quotidian, middle-class life, but beneath the modest, reasonably lighted surfaces of the poems lie unexpected possibilities that create contrast and vibrancy. An example from his 1984 collection The Near World is "The Man on My Porch Makes Me an Offer," which begins:

"Above all houses in our town
I've always loved this blue one you own
With its round turret and big bay window.
Do you dream about it the way I do?
Wouldn't you be just as happy
On a street with more trees
In a larger house, whose columned porch
Impresses every passer-by?
Does it seem fair that you've won the right
To gaze from these windows your whole life
Merely because you saw them first,
And consign me to a life of envy?"

William Slaughter has given a close reading of this poem in an essay comparing poems by William Stafford, Dennis, and Louis Simpson. The form of Dennis's poem - a plainspoken, dramatic monologue - is fairly characteristic of his poetry. In the poem "Progressive Health" (from Practical Gods) Dennis uses a similar approach for a proposition that is a bioethicist's nightmare.

In some of his more recent poems, Dennis invokes guardian angels and other domestic deities to animate his poetry. In his 2004 review, David Orr wrote: 

In his 1984 review, Tom Sleigh addressed the originality of Dennis's art:

Bibliography

References

Further reading

 Dennis' faculty homepage at University at Buffalo.

 Biography and links to several of Dennis' poems.

American male poets
American poets
Jewish American poets
Pulitzer Prize for Poetry winners
Oberlin College alumni
University of Minnesota alumni
1939 births
Living people
21st-century American Jews